Stearidonic acid (SDA: C18H28O2; 18:4, n-3) is an ω-3 fatty acid, sometimes called moroctic acid. It is biosynthesized from alpha-linolenic acid (ALA: C18H30O2; 18:3, n-3) by the enzyme delta-6-desaturase, that removes two hydrogen (H) atoms from a fatty acid, creating a carbon/carbon double bonding, via an oxygen requiring unsaturation. SDA also act as precursor for the rapid synthesis of longer chain fatty acids, called N-acylethanolamine (NAEs), involved in many important biological processes. Natural sources of this fatty acid are the seed oils of hemp, blackcurrant, corn gromwell, and Echium plantagineum, and the cyanobacterium Spirulina. SDA can also be synthesized in a lab. A GMO soybean source is approved by the European Food Safety Authority.

See also
List of omega-3 fatty acids
Omega-3 fatty acids
Essential fatty acids

References

Fatty acids
Alkenoic acids